Port Hope Transit is the local bus service provider in the Municipality of Port Hope, Ontario, which is located on the north shore of Lake Ontario about  east of Toronto. With a population of only 16,390 people in 2006, this is one of the few smaller communities in the province with a fully funded public transit system.

Two regular routes serve the community with an additional inter-municipal shuttle service to Northumberland Mall and Northumberland Hills Hospital in Cobourg, which connects with the Cobourg Transit system. An additional route, which is a modified version of Route A, serves the local high school, Port Hope High School, twice a day while school is in session.

Routes
A- (west side loop)
A (High School Run Only) - Only to the High School twice a day on school days
B- (east side loop)
Port Hope-Cobourg (intermunicipal service)

See also

 Public transport in Canada

References

External links
 Port Hope Transit - Route Map

Transit agencies in Ontario